In tissue and organ transplantation, the passenger leukocyte theory is the proposition that leucocytes within a transplanted allograft sensitize the recipient's alloreactive T-lymphocytes, causing transplant rejection.

The concept was first proposed by George Davis Snell and the term coined in 1968 when Elkins and Guttmann showed that leukocytes present in a donor graft initiate an immune response in the recipient of a transplant.

See also
 History of immunology

References

Further reading
 
 

Immunology
Organ transplantation